Relation curieuse de la Moscovie is a late seventeenth-century account of Russia written by the Frenchman Foy de la Neuville during his ambassadorial visit to that country.

External links
 - Full text.

17th-century books
History books about the Tsardom of Russia